The Myth of Matriarchal Prehistory: Why An Invented Past Will Not Give Women a Future is a 2000 book by Cynthia Eller that seeks to deconstruct the theory of a prehistoric matriarchy. This hypothesis, she says, developed in 19th century scholarship and was taken up by 1970s second-wave feminism following Marija Gimbutas. Eller, a professor of religious studies at Claremont Graduate University, argues in the book that this theory is mistaken and its continued defence is harmful to the feminist agenda.

Thesis
Eller sets out to refute what she describes as feminist matriarchalism as an "ennobling lie".

She argues that the feminist archaeology of Marija Gimbutas had a large part in constructing a late twentieth-century feminist myth of matriarchal prehistory. She questions whether Gimbutas's archaeological findings adequately support the claim that these societies were matriarchal or matrifocal. She says that we know of no cultures in which paternity is ignored and that the sacred status of goddesses does not automatically increase female social status. Eller concludes that inventing prehistoric ages in which women and men lived in harmony and equality "is a burden that feminists need not, and should not bear." In her view, the "matriarchal myth" tarnishes the feminist movement by leaving it open to accusations of "vacuousness and irrelevance that we cannot afford to court."

Criticism

Eller's book has been criticised by feminist historian Max Dashu for "mischaracterising" the theories of Gimbutas and other key anthropologists, and for labeling them as "matriarchalist" despite most of these scholars rejecting ideas of matriarchy (female rulership) in favour of matrifocal or matrilineal societies. Dashu wrote that Eller "makes no distinction between scholarly studies in a wide range of fields and expressions of the burgeoning Goddess movement, including novels, guided tours, market-driven enterprises. [Eller prematurely] conflates all into one monolithic 'myth' devoid of any historical foundation."

Editions
The Myth of Matriarchal Prehistory: Why An Invented Past Will Not Give Women a Future, Beacon Press (2000), .

See also
Matriarchal religion
Heide Göttner-Abendroth
The Inevitability of Patriarchy
Third-wave feminism
When God Was a Woman
Steven Goldberg

References

External links
 Official author site
 "Knocking Down Straw Dolls" - critique by Max Dashu
 Early Human Kinship was Matrilineal, by Chris Knight.
 Marler, Joan. The Myth of Universal Patriarchy: A Critical Response to Cynthia Eller’s Myth of Matriarchal Prehistory. Feminist Theology, Vol. 14, No. 2, 163-187 (2006) (2003 version)

Books about feminism
Matriarchy
2000 non-fiction books
Third-wave feminism
Social sciences books